Commerce National Insurance, Commerce National Insurance Services, or Commerce Insurance Services is the insurance subsidiary of Commerce Bancorp and maintains its headquarters in Cherry Hill, New Jersey. Commerce National is one of the 25 largest insurance agencies in the United States, and is licensed in all 50 states. The current chief executive of Commerce National is George Norcross III.

External links
Commerce National Insurance website

Insurance companies of the United States
National Insurance
Companies based in Camden County, New Jersey
Cherry Hill, New Jersey